The International Ski Federation (FIS) Alpine Ski World Cup was the premier circuit for alpine skiing competition. The inaugural season launched in January 1967, and the  season marked the 52nd consecutive year for the FIS World Cup.

This season began in October 2017 in Sölden, Austria, and concluded in mid-March at the finals in Åre, Sweden. It was interrupted for most of February by the Winter Olympics in Pyeongchang, South Korea; the speed events were held at Jeongseon Alpine Centre with the technical events at Yongpyong Alpine Centre.

Men
With his seventh consecutive overall title, Marcel Hirscher of Austria broke the all-time record of six overall titles (and five consecutive) set by Annemarie Moser-Pröll during the 1970s.

Calendar

Rankings

Overall

Downhill

Super G

Giant Slalom

Slalom

Combined

Women

Calendar

Rankings

Overall

Downhill

Super G

Giant Slalom

Slalom

Combined

Alpine team event

Calendar

Nations Cup

Overall

Men

Ladies

Prize money

Top-5 men

Top-5 ladies

Retirements

Men
  Nolan Casper
  David Chodounsky
  Cristian Deville
  Florian Eisath
  Guillermo Fayed
  Jan Hudec
  Tim Jitloff
  Marcel Mathis
  Rok Perko
  Marcus Sandell
  Patrick Schweiger
  Andrej Šporn
  Patrick Thaler

Women
  Stacey Cook
  Nathalie Eklund
    Denise Feierabend
  Julia Grünwald
  Michaela Kirchgasser
  Kajsa Kling
  Julia Mancuso
  Edit Miklos
  Manuela Mölgg
  Maria Pietilä Holmner 
  Verena Stuffer
  Carmen Thalmann
  Veronika Velez-Zuzulova

Footnotes

References

External links

 
FIS Alpine Ski World Cup
World Cup
World Cup